The Church of St Buryan is a late-15th-century Church of England parish church in St Buryan in Cornwall, England.

Architectural history

A church has stood on the current site since c.930. King Athelstan stopped to pray at Saint Buriana's chapel, of which little now remains, during his conquest of Cornwall before his campaign against the Scilly Isles. He vowed to erect a college of clergy where the oratory stood if God blessed his expedition with success. Upon his triumphant return, having subdued Scilly, Athelstan endowed a church in honour of Saint Buriana with a charter that established St Buryan as one of the earliest monasteries in Cornwall. The church structure was later enlarged and dedicated to the saint in 1238 by Bishop William Brewer However, by 1473 the church had fallen into disrepair, with large sections having to be subsequently rebuilt. Many years later the same granite was used to build Old London Bridge. The tower is divided into four stages, and has double buttresses at each angle. An octagonal turret rises at the south-east corner and contains a spiral staircase. The bulk of the present church building was added in the late 15th and 16th century and the north wall re-built in the 18th century, at the same time as the demolition of a small lean-to chapel on the north wall of the chancel. In 1814, the church was restored yet again when the benches and screen were replaced and on 7 August 1875 the church was re-opened by, Frederick Temple, the Bishop of Exeter following another restoration. He also consecrated the new churchyard. In 1956 the present Lady Chapel was erected as a gift of John Franklin Tonkin, in memory of his uncle, Robert Edmund Tonkin, of Treverven. The church is currently classified as a Grade I listed building.

Status

Because of the nature of the original charter from King Athelstan, the parish of St Buryan was long regarded as a Royal Peculiar, thus falling directly under the jurisdiction of the English monarch as a separate 'diocese', rather than the Church. Between 1300 and 1473 arguments raged between The Crown and the Bishops of Exeter over the status of the parish, with no bishop willing to visit the parish as they had no jurisdiction, telling the King that they were afraid to meddle with St Buryan, "for none dares go there for fear of death and mutilation." Arguments came to a head in 1327 when blood was shed in the churchyard, and in 1328 St Buryan was excommunicated by the Bishop and was not reinstated until 1336. Only two of the King's appointed Deans appear to have actually lived in the 'diocese' of St Buryan for more than a few months, and the combination of these factors led to the subsequent ruinous state of the church in 1473. The Deanery was annexed in 1663 to the Bishopric of Exeter after the English Civil War. However, it was again severed during the rule of 'Bishop' Harris, who thus became the first truly independent dean. The current diocese (i.e. in 1831) holds jurisdiction over the parishes of St Buryan, St Levan, and Sennen.

The church bells
The Church's tower currently houses six handsome bells that call the faithful of St Buryan to worship. St Buryan's famous bells, which contain both the world's third heaviest treble bell and a magnificent tenor bell (the heaviest tenor bell of any six-bell peal), help give the church of St Buryan the heaviest peal of six bells anywhere in the world.

The tower was originally planned to house eight bells, the first such peal in Cornwall, and an order was placed with R. Pennington in 1638.  However, a survey of the church in the late 19th century  detailed  that only three bells were present, dated 1638, 1681 and 1738, suggesting that the work was never completed and also that at least two restorations had occurred during the intervening years. In 1901 a substantial refurbishment was undertaken by Warner's bell foundry who recast two of the old bells and supplemented them with a new tenor whilst also re-tuning the old treble bell. The improved peal was then rehung in a new heavy-duty steel frame; however, the bells again fell into disuse due to a lack of interest from local ringer groups who much preferred the eight-bell peal of St Mary's church in nearby Penzance, and the bells soon became unringable. The bells were restored between 1990 and 2001 due to the efforts of Chris Venn, and the first phase of restoration completed in February 1991 with the rehanging of the original four bells. These were augmented by two bells cast at the Whitechapel Bell Foundry in London after a successful nationwide campaign raised the necessary £80,000 that was supported by the wife of the then Prime Minister Norma Major, bringing the total to six. Bells are now rung regularly by an enthusiastic group from the village.

Organ
The church contains a pipe organ by Heard and Sons dating from 1895. A specification of the organ can be found on the National Pipe Organ Register.

Churchyard

Crosses in St Buryan parish: Arthur Langdon (1896) records twelve crosses in the parish of which one is in the churchyard. A letter, dated 25 June 1879, to The Cornishman newspaper complained of the platform of the village cross, in front of the churchyard gate, being used as the site for the mid-summer bonfire, leaving the cross blackened and charred.

Augustus Smith (1804–1872), the first Lord Proprietor of the Isles of Scilly is buried in the churchyard.

References

St Buryan
English Gothic architecture in Cornwall
Former Royal Peculiars
Grade I listed churches in Cornwall
Penwith